Melchor Palmeiro (26 February 1923 – 31 December 1997) represented Argentina at the 1948 Summer Olympics in London. He was entered in the 1500 m, where he finished fifth in his heat recording a time of 4:01.6 and failed to advance. His personal best in the 1500m was 3:57.8 when he came first at the 1947 South American Championships. He also came second at the Championships in 1943 and again in 1949.

References

External links
 

1923 births
1997 deaths
Argentine male middle-distance runners
Olympic athletes of Argentina
Athletes (track and field) at the 1948 Summer Olympics
20th-century Argentine people